The 2022–23 Texas Longhorns women's basketball team represents the University of Texas at Austin in the 2022–23 NCAA Division I women's basketball season. The team is coached by Vic Schaefer entering his third season at Texas. The Longhorns are members of the Big 12 Conference and play their home games at the new Moody Center. 

This will be the Longhorns' first season at the newly constructed Moody Center. Previously, Texas played at the Frank Erwin Center. This will be the first time the Longhorns have a new arena since 1977 when Texas moved from the Gregory Gymnasium to the Frank Erwin Center.

Previous season

Regular season
Coming into the season, Texas had a lot of momentum going into the 2021–22 season after their Elite 8 appearance in the NCAA tournament the previous season. However, Texas lost star player Charli Collier to the WNBA draft, as she was the first overall pick by the Dallas Wings. With the addition of 2 5-star athletes in Rori Harmon and Aaliyah Moore and 2 4-star athletes in Latasha Lattimore and Kyndall Hunter, the momentum was still high. Texas finished the 2021-22 regular season 23–6, 13–5 in Big 12 play. The Longhorns finished 3rd in the Big 12 behind Iowa State and Baylor. 5-star recruit Rori Harmon emerged as a top freshman as she earned many accolades such as 4-time Big 12 Freshman of the Week, All-Big 12 Second Team, Big 12 All-Defensive Team, Big 12 All-Freshman Team, Big 12 Freshman of the Year, and Big 12 tournament Most Outstanding Player. Harmon also was the first freshman in Texas women’s basketball history to earn All-American Honors. The combination of younger talent with freshmen Rori Harmon and Aaliyah Moore, plus sophomore DeYona Gaston, with the older talent of seniors Joanne Allen-Taylor, Lauren Ebo, Audrey Warren, and junior three point leader Aliyah Matharu, Texas had their most success since the 2017-18 season where the Longhorns went 24–5 during the regular season.

Big 12 tournament
Texas earned a 3-seed in the 2022 Big 12 Conference women's basketball tournament where they would square off against 6-seed Kansas State. Texas would go on to defeat Kansas State 72–65 to advance to the second round. In the second round, the Longhorns faced off against Iowa State. Coming into the game, Texas had swept the Cyclones during the regular season. Texas would go on to win 82–73 in overtime behind Rori Harmon’s 30-point career high performance, advancing them to the championship game against Baylor.
Coming into the game, Texas was riding a 13 game losing streak to Baylor, having not defeated the Bears since the 2016-17 season. The Longhorns would go on to snap the losing streak defeating Baylor 67–58 in the championship game.

*denotes overtime

NCAA tournament
Texas entered the NCAA tournament as a 2-seed where they faced off against 15-seed Fairfield. The Longhorns would go on to defeat the Stags 70–52, advancing Texas to the round of 32. In the round of 32, Texas played against 7-seed Utah. Texas defeated the Utes 78–56 sending them to the sweet 16 to match up with Ohio State. Against the Buckeyes, Texas won 66–63 advance Texas to their second consecutive elite 8. In the elite 8, the Longhorns faced Stanford, who they beat earlier in the regular season. However, Stanford prevailed against Texas, winning the game 59–50.

Spokane Regional final

Offseason

Returning players

Departures

Outgoing Transfers

Coaching Staff Departures

Acquisitions

Incoming Transfers

2022 Recruiting Class

|-
| colspan="7" style="padding-left:10px;" | Overall recruiting rankings:
|-
| colspan="7" style="font-size:85%; background:#F5F5F5;" | 

|}

2023 Recruiting Class

|-
| colspan="7" style="padding-left:10px;" | Overall recruiting rankings:
|-
| colspan="7" style="font-size:85%; background:#F5F5F5;" | 

|}

Coaching Staff Additions

Preseason

Big 12 Media Poll

Source:

Award watch lists
Listed in the order that they were released

Preseason All-Big 12 teams

Source:

Roster

Support Staff

Roster Outlook

Schedule and results

|-
!colspan=12 style=| Exhibition 

|-
!colspan=9 style=|Non-Conference Regular Season 

|-
!colspan=12 style=| Big 12 Regular Season

|-
!colspan=9 style=|Big 12 Tournament (2–1)

|-
!colspan=12 style=|NCAA Tournament

Source:Schedule

Postseason

Big 12 tournament

Team and individual statistics

Awards and honors

Source:

Rankings

See also
 2022–23 Texas Longhorns men's basketball team

References

Texas Longhorns women's basketball seasons
Texas Longhorns
Texas Longhorns
Texas
Texas